The Egypt River is a stream in Ipswich, Massachusetts, United States.

The river is formed by the confluence of Bull and Dow brooks below their reservoirs, and in turn joins the Muddy River and then the Rowley River, which empties into the Plum Island Sound.

The name Egypt River is recorded as early as 1635. In early colonial times, it was also termed the North River. It was then a source of herring and smelt, but few have been observed since the 1970s.

References 
 US Environmental Protection Agency

Rivers of Essex County, Massachusetts
Rivers of Massachusetts